Paul J. Smith may refer to:

 Paul Smith (composer) (1906–1985), American music composer
 Paul Smith (animator) (1906–1980), American animator and director
 Paul J. Smith (arts administrator) (born 1931), American arts administrator, curator and artist
 Paul J. Smith (scholar), author, professor Emeritus in French literature, Leiden University